Hermann Schneider (born 1921) was a Swiss boxer. He competed in the men's middleweight event at the 1948 Summer Olympics.

References

External links
 

1921 births
Possibly living people
Swiss male boxers
Olympic boxers of Switzerland
Boxers at the 1948 Summer Olympics
Place of birth missing
Middleweight boxers